Advantageous is a 2015 American science fiction drama film starring Jacqueline Kim, James Urbaniak, Freya Adams, Ken Jeong, Jennifer Ehle, and Samantha Kim. The film was released exclusively on Netflix on June 23, 2015.

Plot
Set in the near future, Gwen sells cosmetic procedures for the Center for Advanced Health and Living. Despite her relatively affluent position, she has difficulty sustaining a lifestyle that will ensure her daughter, Jules, a solid education and future. When she is abruptly fired from her job, Gwen's optimism quickly dissolves as she realizes that the only offer she has for employment is an egg donor position, due to women rapidly becoming infertile. The firing comes at a critical juncture in Gwen's life as she needs money to secure Jules's position at an elite school.

Feeling desperate, Gwen reaches out to her old employer, Fisher, to volunteer as one of the first subjects for a procedure that will transfer her consciousness into a new body, allowing her to keep her old job by becoming more youthful and racially ambiguous. Fisher assures her that if she agrees to the body transfer, the center will do everything it can to ensure Jules's future and protect Gwen as the face of the company. He also warns her that the procedure is still in its infancy; for a year, Gwen will have to take shots every two hours to help her breathe, otherwise she will face enduring pain. He explains that the technology is not finished yet and begs her to reconsider. Worrying that she will not be able to find another job at her age, Gwen decides to undergo the procedure.

Before agreeing to the procedure, Gwen tries one last desperate measure, reaching out to her cousin Lily and Lily's husband, Han, for help. Gwen and Han had an affair years ago, and, though Lily had forgiven the affair, her attitude changes once she learns that Gwen has a child fathered by Han. She tells Gwen they need more time to think about helping her, especially considering the suddenness of the news, but Gwen tells them that she has no time. Lily says she and her husband cannot spare the money, as they have children of their own.

Gwen breaks the news of her procedure to Jules, who seems to be understanding of the circumstances. Together, they go to see Gwen's future body. After spending Christmas with Jules, Gwen completes the procedure and returns home in a new body, Gwen 2.0. Gwen 2.0 is unrecognizable and carries none of Gwen's distinguishing physical traits. Post-procedure, Gwen 2.0 is disoriented and in pain, but she does her work for the center well. Jules, who had been warned that her mother might be slightly different, takes care of her and administers her shots when she has difficulty breathing. However, Gwen 2.0 has trouble understanding and relating to Jules after the procedure. She tells Fisher she wants to separate from Jules, believing that Jules can take care of herself and would prefer being alone. Fisher is furious and reveals to Gwen 2.0 that she is not Gwen, but a twin that had been implanted with Gwen's memories; he explains the twin process to her because he thinks it will be easier for the twin Gwen to merge with the donor's memories by learning the truth. Gwen's original consciousness died during the procedure, but she was willing to go through with it to ensure her daughter's future. Gwen 2.0 is unaffected by the news and tells Fisher the part of Gwen that loved Jules did not transfer. When she returns home, she tells Jules that her mother is dead. Jules, in response to the news, initially hides the shot Gwen 2.0 needs to breathe but eventually gives it to her. When Jules tells Gwen 2.0 she is not sure why she kept her alive, Gwen 2.0 reassures her that her kindness is unique to her. Jules tells her she sounds like her mother.

Gwen 2.0 later sees a message from Lily and Han in which they apologize for their initial dismissal and tell her that they would like to help her and Jules. Gwen 2.0 goes to their home and breaks the news about Gwen to them. Later, she organizes a picnic so that Jules can meet Han, Lily, and their boys for the first time.

Cast and characters

Production

A Good Neighbors Media production in association with D.K. Entertainment and I Ain't Playin' Films. Produced by Robert Chang, Jennifer Phang, Jacqueline Kim, Theresa Navarro, Moon Molson, and Ken Jeong.
Co-producers, James Y. Shih, Qi Luo, Sean Gillane, Liz Ortiz-Mackes, Bogdan George Apetri, Clifton Lewis.
Crew: Directed by Jennifer Phang. Screenplay, Jacqueline Kim, Phang. Camera (colour, HD), Richard Wong; editor, Sean Gillane, Phang; music, Timo Chen; production designer, Dara Wishingrad; costume designer, Stacey Jordan; conceptual designer, Aiyana Trotter; sound Tyson Dai; sound designer, Tyler Straub; re-recording mixer, James LeBrecht; visual effects supervisors, Catherine Tate, Ricardo Marmolejo, Jason Patnode; assistant director, Yasmine Gomez; casting, Liz Ortiz-Mackes.

Pre-production
Advantageous in its feature form debuted at Sundance 2015. The foundation of the film was originally shot by Phang and Kim as a 23-minute short film, with ITVS for Futurestates. Phang is known to be heavily involved with the filmmaking process, she directed and co-wrote the film as well as achieved a shared editing credit. Kim began as the star of the short film until Phang asked her to co-write the short into a feature. Pre-production lasted about a year while Kim and Phang took turns writing the short. The casting process was not too difficult because most of the cast were re-casts from the short. The film was influenced by Age of Innocence, Mad Men, Battlestar Galactica, and Ghost in the Shell. Phang was connected with most of her VFX artists from her previous film Half Life, in 2008. Phang wanted to create a city that was not recognizable, so they filmed in Manhattan, Brooklyn, Los Angeles, and San Francisco. Since the budget was so low, they also could not create a city from scratch, so having many different cities for locations was ideal for Phang.

Filming
Filming began in 2012 in New York City, New York when Phang was making Advantageous as a short. The foundation grew throughout 2013-2014, when they expanded locations to Los Angeles and San Francisco, to then be released as a feature, in 2015. The Cinematographer, Richard Wong worked closely with Phang during production. He was able to find incredible masters on small sets. Lighting was created by Wong and Seng Chen. Much of the footage was also shot by Ming Kai Leung, when in Los Angeles.

Post-production
Sean Gillane and Phang worked together using Premiere Pro and After Effects. They traded the cutback and forth until the end. Sean produced supplemental motion graphics and comps while editing. Phang and Sean used Dynamic Link to jump easily from Premiere Pro to After Effects when creating VFX with the VFX team. Phang needed an additional editor and met Gena Bleier, through one of her producers Moon Molson, and hired her. Bleier previously cut The Bravest, The Boldest, which then went to the Sundance and Clermont Ferrand. Phang worked with VFX Art Director, Jean Elston, and a design team to create a concept for buildings. In the script, there are two buildings, the Cryer and the Orator. The Cryer is a mannequin-shaped building with water spilling down its neck, mimicking crying. The Orator has smoke coming from its mouth to express the struggle women have when they speak their minds to the world and dissipate into the sky. The buildings were designed by Elston and Phang and executed by Catherine Tate, Ricardo Marmolejo, and Jason Patnode, working with experienced groups of VFX and CG artists.

Soundtrack

Song list
1.	Opening	 3:31
2.	I Like It	 0:30
3.	Les Femmes	 1:33
4.	Center for Advanced Health and Living	 1:46
5.	Both	 0:36
6.	Cryer Building	 1:18
7.	You've Been Pursued	 1:50
8.	Drake	 2:00
9.	Let's Get You Something to Eat	 0:49
10.	Luncheon	 2:06
11.	Asians	 0:49
12.	End Call	 0:34
13.	Jar	 0:45
14.	Photos	 2:34
15.	Gwen Signs	 3:56
16.	The Quiet Rooms	 2:02
17.	The Experience	 6:30
18.	Tunnel	 0:34
19.	What Happened	 0:41
20.	Pier	 4:06
21.	Jules Plots	 0:31
22.	Becoming Gwen	 1:42
23.	Becoming Jules	 1:34
 You can find the album on iTunes or Amazon.

Timo Chen is the composer of the soundtrack. He is a pianist, virtuoso guitarist, versatile composer, arranger songwriter, and music producer. Chen studied at the USC Community School of Performing Arts and the Oberlin Conservatory of Music. The lead, Jacqueline Kim, is a pianist, so Phang wanted to incorporate the piano in most of the soundtrack so Kim could play in the film. Phang intentionally chose most of the songs for being about Jesus Christ to focus on the theme of patriarchy and following the leadership of men in the world. Phang started brainstorming ideas for sound, with Timo Chen during pre-production. Phang was looking for sounds that are organic and technological at the same time. Chen used a variety of different mechanisms to achieve Phang's sound goals, including a toothbrush, vibrator, and a professional violinist. Phang also worked with sound designer Tyler Straub to create sounds that could be familiar to the audience, like Apple products.

Release
The film premiered at the Sundance Film Festival on January 26, 2015. The film was released exclusively on Netflix on June 23, 2015.

Reception
 Metacritic rated it 59/100 based on nine reviews. Dennis Harvey of Variety called it a "thinking person's sci-fi tale" whose methodical pacing eventually slows down to a near-crawl. Leslie Felperin wrote, "Perhaps the perfect film for geeky women's studies majors, this is bursting with interesting ideas and details but has some significant flaws". Manohla Dargis of The New York Times wrote, "It's a kick to see how effectively Ms. Phang has created the future on a shoestring even if she hasn't yet figured out how to turn all her smart ideas into a fully realized feature." G. Allen Johnson of the San Francisco Chronicle rated it 3/4 stars and wrote that "the last half hour is so irresistibly creepy that it's sure to invoke discussion after the screening".

Alan Scherstuhl of The Village Voice wrote that the film "demands we consider just how much beauty-minded societies demand of women". Because of its unconventional structure, Scherstuhl says it is likely to alienate viewers who are looking for a traditional story. Kevin P. Sullivan of Entertainment Weekly rated it C and called it a "missed opportunity". Mike D'Angelo of The Dissolve rated it 3/5 stars and wrote that despite the feature film adaptation's filler, fans of intelligent science fiction may be interested. Diego Costa of Slant Magazine rated it 1.5/4 stars and wrote, "Advantageouss visual effects are sophisticated for a low-budget film, and the acting is pleasantly realistic, but filmmaker Jennifer Phang portrays this very near future like a universe of such quietness and sterility that it's difficult to care about its inhabitants."

Advantageous creators Jennifer Phang and Jacqueline Kim won a Sundance Special Jury Award for Collaborative Vision, and the film was nominated for the John Cassavetes Award at the Film Independent Spirit Awards.

Awards

Advantageous took home editing, score, and directing awards at the LA Asian Pacific Film Fest in 2015. The lead, Jacqueline Kim, also won a jury award for her Renaissance Artist accomplishments for co-writing and starring in the feature.

VC FilmFest - Los Angeles Asian Pacific Film Festival 2015
Winnings (Special Jury Prize)
Best Director - Narrative Feature
Best Editing - Narrative Feature
Shared with: Sean Gillane
Nominee (Grand Jury Prize)
Best Narrative Feature
Winner (Golden Reel Award)

Themes

Ageism & Workplace Discrimination
Ageism and workplace discrimination are both conveyed throughout Advantageous. In the film, Gwen has experienced discrimination in the workplace due to her age. In one scene of the film, it was established that Gwen was more competent in terms of experience and intellect with her age being the primary reason of her abrupt discharge. The scene overall portrayed unethical practice of Center for Advanced Health And Living of laying off Gwen for her age, which is illegal to do in the real world by the Age Discrimination in Employment Act of 1967. It have shown parallel examples of companies that laid off older employees. The film therefore has drawn attention to the issues and reinforced how it is problematic in the current society.

Racism
Elements of racism are embodied in Advantageous. After Gwen's transfer into a new host body, not only does she become a younger woman, she also changes her race. None of the provided host bodies Gwen got to choose from was of the Asian race, Gwen's race. The scene suggested that Asians do not fit the criteria of being the face of the company. Jennifer Phang did this intentionally to serve as an example of discrimination against Asians in our society and the lack of Asian representation in the media. The example had been an issue in the United States for many years. There has been "historic trend in the under-representation of minorities in U.S. media, especially in the case of Asian Americans" which the film have highlighted.

Income Gap
Gwen experiences the effects of gendered pay. At the Center for Advanced Health And Living, Gwen has "been working below the rate for a while." That served as a reflection of the unequal pay between men and women in 2015. The median annual income of females then was "$40,742 compared with $51,212 for men." These statistics suggested that women were being paid on average, 20% less than men. That presented a significant feminist issue that Advantageous embodies.

Not only income gaps between men and women was showcased in the movie, but the income gap between the rich and poor has also been implied. US unemployment in the film is at 45% and "success is by no means guaranteed for a growing number of families." In a 2015 interview, Phang explained how she had always perceived homelessness in science fiction as "unfair and really sad." The film showed the audience a future where the aforementioned issue is prevalent.

Parental Sacrifices
In a social climate where the competition is fierce, Gwen has to make great sacrifices as a single mother to provide Jules with a good life. Being able to provide for Jules is the primary motive for Gwen to undergo Fisher's dangerous procedure. Advantageous dived into "how much a mother is willing to do to give her child a leg up in a precarious world." It was shown throughout the film that mothers often feel pressure to participate in status safeguarding which refers to "'mothers' urgent, sacrificial, protective work in the goal of reproducing or improving class status for their children." Jennifer Phang witnessed the pattern with her mother. In an interview, Phang explained how her mother served as a great inspiration to her as she "worked three jobs as once" so that she could ensure Phang had "as many opportunities as possible." Like Gwen in the film, Phang's mother did this while "practically being a single mom" as her father was abroad.

References

External links
 

2015 films
2010s science fiction drama films
Films about Chinese Americans
Films about Korean Americans
Asian-American drama films
American science fiction drama films
Body swapping in films
Films about brain transplants
2015 drama films
2010s English-language films
2010s American films